Night Time is the fifth studio album by English post-punk band Killing Joke, released in February 1985 by E.G. through Polydor Records and produced by Chris Kimsey.

Release 

Night Time was released in late February 1985 by E.G. Records. It was an international hit, reaching number 11 in the United Kingdom in its first week on 9 March, number 8 in New Zealand and  number 50 in Sweden.

The album was remastered and reissued in 2008 with nine bonus tracks, including 1984 Kid Jensen BBC radio sessions, the non-album single "A New Day" and the previously-unreleased complete version of "Blue Feather" (previously only available as an instrumental remix on the B-side to "Love Like Blood").

Critical Reception 

The album generally received favourable response. In retrospective reviews, PopMatters opined that the band "perfected" their "balance between antagonism and accessibility", commenting "the band are simply on fire on this record". AllMusic commented that the album finds the band "caught between their earlier aggression and a calmer, more immediately accessible approach".

Track listing

Personnel
Killing Joke
 Jaz Coleman – vocals, keyboards
 Kevin "Geordie" Walker – guitar
 Paul Raven – bass guitar
 Paul Ferguson – drums, vocals

Production and artwork
 Chris Kimsey – production, mixing
 Brian McGhee – engineering
 Thomas Stiehler – engineering
 Jeff Veitch – photography
 Rob O'Connor - sleeve design
 Alex Zander – crew
 Brad Nelson – crew
 Fil. E. – crew

Charts

References

External links 

 

1985 albums
Killing Joke albums
Albums produced by Chris Kimsey
E.G. Records albums
Post-punk albums by English artists